Mo is a village in the municipality of Nord-Odal in Innlandet county, Norway. It is located at the northern end of the lake Storsjøen. Mo Church and an elementary school are both located in this village.

References

Nord-Odal
Villages in Innlandet